Empire of the Air: The Men Who Made Radio is a non-fiction book by Tom Lewis, which traces the early development of radio broadcasting in the United States, published by HarperCollins in 1991. The book was adapted into both a 1992 documentary film by Ken Burns and a 1992 radio drama written and directed by David Ossman. The source of the title is from a quote by Lee de Forest.

Documentary
Ken Burns' documentary first aired on PBS on January 29, 1992, narrated by actor Jason Robards. The film focused primarily  on the three pioneers of radio in America: Lee de Forest, Edwin Howard Armstrong, and David Sarnoff. The program interspersed audio and musical highlights of "old time" radio with the stories, achievements, failures, scams and bitter feuds between each of the main protagonists. Among the interviewees featured are radio and television historian Erik Barnouw, dramatist Norman Corwin, and sportscaster Red Barber.

Drama
Broadcast on public radio, the Ossman radio drama originated in 1992 from Washington's WETA. The cast included Steve Allen as narrator, John Randolph as de Forest, David Ogden Stiers as Armstrong, and Harris Yulin as Sarnoff.

See also
List of old-time radio programs
Amateur radio
FM radio

References

External links
PBS: Empire of the Air: The Men Who Made Radio 
IMDB: Empire of the Air: The Men Who Made Radio
WHYY: Empire of the Air

1991 non-fiction books
American non-fiction books
HarperCollins books
Works about radio
Works about radio people
1992 films
American radio dramas
American documentary television films
Films directed by Ken Burns
1992 television films
Documentary films about radio
Documentary films about radio people
1990s English-language films
1990s American films